The MacKinnon Glacier is a glacier flowing northward along the west side of Reilly Ridge into Sledgers Glacier in the Lanterman Range of the Bowers Mountains, Antarctica. It was named in 1983 by the New Zealand Antarctic Place-Names Committee after geologist D.I. MacKinnon, a member of R.A. Cooper's New Zealand Antarctic Research Program geological party in the area, 1974–75.

References

Glaciers of Pennell Coast